Rern Sinat (born 1 September 1995) is a Cambodian model and beauty pageant titleholder who won the Miss Cambodia 2017 on 1 September 2017 in Kampong Cham, Cambodia. She is the second Miss Cambodia to compete for the title of Miss Universe in history.

Personal life
Sinat lives in Kampong Cham. She previously worked as a DJ on ABC Cambodia. In 2017, Sinat won Miss Cambodia 2017 and represented her country at the Miss Universe 2018. As Miss Cambodia she is involved in corporate social responsibility initiatives, including tree planting and a football clinic.

Pageantry

Miss Cambodia 2017
Sinat was crowned Miss Cambodia 2017 on 1 September 2017 at the Grand Ballroom of Hotel Naga World. She was crowned together with runners-up, Keo Senglyhour, Kem Sreykeo, Long Punleu and Kha Annchhany.

Miss Universe 2018
Sinat represented Cambodia in Miss Universe 2018 but Unplaced.

References

External links

Living people
Miss Universe 2018 contestants
1995 births
Cambodian beauty pageant winners
Cambodian female models
People from Kampong Cham province